Music is the fifth studio album by American ambient post-rock band, Windsor Airlift.  It was released on September 23, 2013.

Background
In August 2013, Windsor Airlift started a kickstarter for their up-and-coming album Music.  Around this time, they also announced that they would be having an album art contest for the album.  After approximately 220 entries came in, the band announced the winner on September 6, 2013.  The kickstarter was also a success and the band was able to release a quantity of physical copies for the release which are currently still available.

On October 13, 2013, the Johnson brothers did an interview with Flux9.com about the release and Windsor Airlift in general.

Track listing

"Music Through the Window" performed by Emily Johnson

Music videos

Notes and miscellanea
The song "Silhouette Harbor" was originally intended to be on the album Moonfish Parachutist 2.  However, this album has yet to come to fruition.  The release of Music encouraged the band to place it on this album instead.
As an added bonus to the success of the kickstarter, Windsor Airlift released The Adventures of Flames Pond in its entirety to YouTube.

References

2013 albums
Windsor Airlift albums